Bulbophyllum comptonii is a species of orchid in the genus Bulbophyllum. The name of the orchid refers to its bulbous leaf shape.

References
The Bulbophyllum-Checklist
The Internet Orchid Species Photo Encyclopedia

comptonii